Trinodes emarginatus, is a species of skin beetle found in India and Sri Lanka.

Description
Total body length is about 2 mm. Pronotum and elytra light brown. Elytra clothed with yellow setae.

References 

Dermestidae
Insects of Sri Lanka
Insects described in 1915